Tribute to My Father is an album by American musician Hank Williams Jr. This album was released on September 21, 1993 on the Curb Records label.

Track listing
 "Honky Tonkin'" – 2:18
 "Are You Sure Hank Done It This Way" – 3:08
 "Lovesick Blues" – 2:14
 "Ballad of Hank Williams" – 3:24
 "A Whole Lot of Hank" – 2:57
 "Kaw-Liga" – 4:25
 "Move It On Over" – 3:09
 "The Conversation" – 3:54
 "You're Gonna Change (Or I'm Gonna Leave)" – 3:55
 "If You Don't Like Hank Williams" – 2:51

External links
 Hank Williams Jr's Official Website
 Record Label

1993 albums
Hank Williams Jr. albums
Curb Records albums